Sugar Mountain is the debut studio album by Australian singer-songwriter Jack River, released on 22 June 2018.

At the AIR Awards of 2020, the album was nominated for Best Independent Pop Album or EP.

Release and promotion
On 31 May 2019, the album was re-released in a deluxe edition, featuring a new single "Adolescent", a cover of Neil Young's "Sugar Mountain" and alternate versions of "Fools Gold" and "Fault Line".

Singles
The album was supported by five singles: "Fool's Gold", released on 22 June 2017, "Fault Line", released on 17 November 2017, "Ballroom", released on 27 February 2018, "Limo Song", released on 1 June 2018, and "Confess", released on 31 October 2018.

"Adolescent" was released as the deluxe edition's sole single on 13 April 2019.

Critical reception

Sugar Mountain received "universal acclaim".

Dylan Marshall from The AU Review said: "As the first album of the artist also known as Holly Rankin, you're exposed to the sugary highs of sweet pop, whilst also left mourning within the depths of despair and complete heartbreak." adding "You're going to have a good time listening to the album, but you'll be sad, and you won't know why." Marshall concluded the review saying "The album is a pearler" and "She's managed to release an album of pure class and beauty, whilst willingly and knowingly making herself open to the public gaze.".

Alexander Crowden of Beat Magazine said: "To put it simply, River has released one of the greatest Australian debut albums of the past decade. Every single moment on Sugar Mountain is a surefire winner, and there's an instant appeal apparent on each of the 13 tracks adorning River's debut. Her glorious voice cascades over stunning soundscapes that dance the fine line between intimate and cinematic."

Josh Leeson of The Newcastle Herald said: "Sugar Mountain is at once intensely emotional and a shiny fabrication. It's taken... five years to build this songbook which aims to paint an alternate childhood from her own, which was marred by the death of her 11-year-old sister.".

Triple J said: "Each song takes you into a melancholic pastel dream, recalling musical influences of her formative teenage years. You can hear the folk tinges of Neil Young and Joni Mitchell taken from her parent's record collection alongside the self-navigated discoveries of gritty guitars and power-pop hooks".

Tim Lamber from Stack Magazine said "If you look only at Sugar Mountain through the sparkling, rose-coloured glasses that River has draped over the album, you might not be rewarded with uncovering the confidential and vulnerable world she has created – but which she is encouraging you to discover."

Tina Odukoyat from Never Enough Notes said: "The electropop album, inspired by her favourite Neil Young song, includes intense guitar motifs, heavy drum riffs and crystal clear vocals, all perfectly apt for a glitter filled festival headliner spot." He added, "Sugar Mountain is a personal and bold debut album that laments River's lost youth, yet simultaneously oozes a glowing sense of hope. It's a record that deserves to be performed on a big festival stage in all its sparkly and glittery glory".

Year-end lists

Commercial performance
Sugar Mountain debuted and peaked at number 11 on the ARIA Albums Chart for the chart dated 2 July 2018, before falling 70 positions the following week.

Track listing

Awards and nominations
At the 32nd Annual ARIA Music Awards, the album was nominated for two awards; Best Pop Release and Breakthrough Artist. Rankin, Xavier Dunn and John Castle were additionally nominated for Engineer of the Year for their production on the album.

|-
| rowspan="3"| 2018  
| rowspan="2"| Sugar Mountain 
| Breakthrough Artist 
| rowspan="3" 
|-
| Best Pop Release 
|-
| Holly Rankin, Xavier Dunn & John Castle (for Sugar Mountain)
| Engineer of the Year

Charts

Release history

References

2018 debut albums
Jack River (musician) albums